Guelleh Batal de la Garde Républicaine, more commonly known as Garde Républicaine FC or simply Garde, is a Djiboutian football club located in Djibouti City, Djibouti. It currently plays in the Djibouti Premier League.

Stadium
Currently the team plays at the 20,000 capacity Stade du Ville.

Current squad

References

External links
Soccerway

Football clubs in Djibouti